Beaux Arts Park Historic District is a national historic district located at Huntington Bay in Suffolk County, New York.  The district has nine contributing buildings and one contributing structure.  It is a concentrated residential community with five large stucco residences in the Tudor Revival and Spanish Revival styles dated from about 1905 to 1915.

It was added to the National Register of Historic Places in 1985.

References

External links
Beaux Arts Park Historic District Map (Living Places)

National Register of Historic Places in Huntington (town), New York
Colonial Revival architecture in New York (state)
Historic districts in Suffolk County, New York
Historic districts on the National Register of Historic Places in New York (state)